Linehan Glacier is a glacier,  long, in Antarctica. It flows northeast from Prince Andrew Plateau along the north side of Turnabout Ridge to enter Lowery Glacier.

References

Glaciers of the Ross Dependency
Shackleton Coast